The 2008–09 Vermont Catamounts season was their fourth in Hockey East. Led by head coach Tim Bothwell, the Catamounts had 7 victories, compared to 25 defeats and 2 ties. Their conference record was 4 victories, 15 defeats and 2 ties.

Regular season

Standings

Schedule

Awards and honors
Erin Barley-Maloney, Hockey East All-Rookie Team

Team records
Team Single Season Record, Most Power Play Goals, (26), 2008–09
Individual Single Game Record, Most Points, 4, Peggy Wakeham (1-3-4), at Union (10/10/08)
Individual Single Game Record, Most Points, Def. 4, Peggy Wakeham(1-3-4), at Union (10/10/08)
Individual Single Game Record, Most Assists, 3, Peggy Wakeham, at Northeastern (2/14/09)
Individual Single Game Record, Most Assists, 3, Erin Barley-Maloney, at Providence (1/18/08)
Individual Single Game Record, Most Assists, 3, Peggy Wakeham, at Union (10/10/08)
Individual Single Season Record, Most Points - D-I, 22, Peggy Wakeham (2008–09)
Individual Single Season Record, Most Assists - D-I, 16, Peggy Wakeham (2008–09)
Individual Single Season Record, Most Points – Defenseman, 22, Peggy Wakeham (2008–09)
Individual Single Season Record, Most Goals – Defenseman, 6, Peggy Wakeham (2008–09)
Individual Single Season Record, Most Assists – Defensemen, 16, Peggy Wakeham (2008–09)
Individual Single Season Record, Most Assists – Freshman, 15, Erin Barley-Maloney (2008–09)

References

Vermont
Vermont Catamounts women's ice hockey seasons
Cata
Cata